Mars-Grunt, also known as Expedition-M, is a robotic spacecraft sample return mission proposed to be sent to Mars in mid-2020s. It was proposed to the Russian Federal Space Agency (Roscosmos) by the Russian Space Research Institute.

Lander
If funded by the Russian space agency Roscosmos, it would be developed by the Russian Space Research Institute and NPO Lavochkin, based on Fobos-Grunt technology. 
Designs show a dome-shaped lander would separate from the orbiter and would enter the Martian atmosphere protected within an inflatable rubber braking cone and fire retrorockets for a soft landing. Once a robotic arm selects and retrieves the samples (mass about ), a small rocket in the top of the lander would blast the ascent vehicle for rendezvous and docking with the orbiter for the soil sample transfer into the return vehicle.

Cruise stage
The cruise stage PM (from Pereletny Modul ) is sometimes referred to as Flagman. It was developed for the Fobos-Grunt mission, but its basic architecture is promised to be the base for a whole generation of future planetary missions, including Luna-Glob, Luna-Resurs and Luna-Grunt to the Moon; Venera-D to Venus; Mars-NET and Mars-Grunt to Mars and, possibly, Sokol-Laplas to Jupiter. The platform's developer - NPO Lavochkin - stressed that in different configuration, the same bus could be adapted as an orbiter or as a lander.

Status 

If the technology being developed for Luna Glob to the Moon, and Fobos-Grunt 2 to Mars' moon Phobos, is proved successful, it will then be used on Mars-Grunt.

See also

Phobos program

References

 

Proposed space probes
Missions to Mars
Russian space probes
Sample return missions
2025 in spaceflight